Siraparapu Ashish (born 2 November 1998) is an Indian cricketer. He made his List A debut for Andhra Pradesh in the 2017–18 Vijay Hazare Trophy on 5 February 2018. He made his first-class debut on 4 February 2020, for Andhra in the 2019–20 Ranji Trophy. He made his Twenty20 debut on 19 January 2021, for Andhra in the 2020–21 Syed Mushtaq Ali Trophy.

References

External links
 

1998 births
Living people
Indian cricketers
Andhra cricketers